Heteropolygonatum is a genus of plants in the  Nolinoideae. It is native to China and Vietnam.

Heteropolygonatum ginfushanicum (F.T.Wang & Tang) M.N.Tamura, S.C.Chen & Turland - Sichuan, Hubei, Guizhou
Heteropolygonatum ogisui M.N.Tamura & J.M.Xu - Sichuan
Heteropolygonatum pendulum (Z.G.Liu & X.H.Hu) M.N.Tamura & Ogisu - Sichuan
Heteropolygonatum roseolum M.N.Tamura & Ogisu - Guangxi
Heteropolygonatum urceolatum J.M.H.Shaw - Guangxi, Vietnam
Heteropolygonatum xui W.K.Bao & M.N.Tamura - Sichuan

References

Nolinoideae
Asparagaceae genera